Beinn Iutharn Mhor (1,045 m) is a mountain in the Grampian Mountains of Scotland. It lies north of Glen Shee on the Aberdeenshire and Perthshire border.

A steep sided mountain in an otherwise rolling area of highland known as the Mounth, it is usually climbed from its northern Glen Ey side.

References

Mountains and hills of Aberdeenshire
Mountains and hills of Perth and Kinross
Marilyns of Scotland
Munros
One-thousanders of Scotland